Hosta albofarinosa is a species of the genus Hosta.

References

albofarinosa